Suhita or Soheeta (died 1447), was a Javanese queen regnant and the sixth monarch of the Majapahit empire, ruling from 1429 to 1447.

Early life 
She was the daughter of King Vikramavardhana, her predecessor, by a concubine who was the daughter of 2nd Duke of Virabhumi, who was killed in the Regreg civil war with Vikramavardhana. She was succeeded by her brother,  Dyah Kertavijaya, the future King Vijayaparakramavardhana.

Legend 
The Damarwulan legend is associated with her reign, as it involves a maiden queen (Prabu Kenya in the story), and during Suhita's reign there was a war with Blambangan as in the legend.

A notable monumental sculpture found in Tulungagung Regency, East Java has been identified by some authors as of Suhita. She is dressed in royal attire, including ear pendants, necklaces, bracelets, anklets, and pendants hung from several girdles. In her right hand, she holds a lotus bud, which symbolized deceased royalty in transformation.

Notes

Queens of Majapahit
Indonesian Hindu monarchs
Javanese monarchs
1447 deaths
15th-century women rulers
Year of birth unknown
15th-century monarchs in Asia
15th-century Indonesian women
15th-century Hindus